Stutthof was a Nazi concentration camp established by Nazi Germany in a secluded, marshy, and wooded area near the village of Stutthof (now Sztutowo) 34 km (21 mi) east of the city of Danzig (Gdańsk) in the territory of the German-annexed Free City of Danzig. The camp was set up around existing structures after the invasion of Poland in World War II and initially used for the imprisonment of Polish leaders and intelligentsia. The actual barracks were built the following year by prisoners. Most of the infrastructure of the concentration camp was either destroyed or dismantled shortly after the war. In 1962, the former concentration camp with its remaining structures, was turned into a memorial museum.

Stutthof was the first German concentration camp set up outside German borders in World War II, in operation from 2 September 1939. It was also the last camp liberated by the Allies, on 9 May 1945. It is estimated that between 63,000 and 65,000 prisoners of Stutthof concentration camp and its subcamps died as a result of murder, starvation, epidemics, extreme labour conditions, brutal and forced evacuations, and a lack of medical attention. Some 28,000 of those who died were Jews. In total, as many as 110,000 people were deported to the camp in the course of its existence. About 24,600 were transferred from Stutthof to other locations.

Camp 
The camp was established in connection with the ethnic cleansing project that included the liquidation of Polish elites (members of the intelligentsia, religious and political leaders) in the Danzig area and Western Prussia.

Even before the war began, the German Selbstschutz in Pomerania created lists of people to be arrested, and the Nazi authorities were secretly reviewing suitable places to set up concentration camps in their area.

Originally, Stutthof was a civilian internment camp under the Danzig police chief, before its subsequent massive expansion. In November 1941, it became a "labor education" camp (like Dachau), administered by the German Security Police. Finally, in January 1942, Stutthof became a regular concentration camp.

The original camp (known as the old camp) was surrounded by the barbed-wire fence. It comprised eight barracks for the inmates and a "Kommandantur" for the SS guards, totaling . In 1943, the camp was enlarged and a new camp was constructed alongside the earlier one. A crematorium and gas chamber were added in 1943, just in time to start mass executions when Stutthof was included in the "Final Solution" in June 1944. Mobile gas wagons were also used to complement the maximum capacity of the gas chamber (150 people per execution) when needed.

Staff 

The camp staff consisted of German SS guards and, after 1943, the Ukrainian auxiliaries brought in by SS-Gruppenführer Fritz Katzmann, the Higher SS and Police Leader of the area.

In 1942 the first German female SS Aufseherinnen guards arrived at Stutthof along with female prisoners. A total of 295 women guards worked as staff in the Stutthof complex of camps.

Among the notable female guard personnel were: Elisabeth Becker, Erna Beilhardt, Ella Bergmann, Ella Blank, Gerda Bork, Herta Bothe, Erna Boettcher, Hermine Boettcher-Brueckner, Steffi Brillowski, Charlotte Graf, Charlotte Gregor, Charlotte Klein, Gerda Steinhoff, Ewa Paradies, and Jenny-Wanda Barkmann. Thirty-four female guards including Becker, Bothe, Steinhoff, Paradies, and Barkmann were identified later as having committed crimes against humanity. The SS in Stutthof began conscripting women from Danzig and the surrounding cities in June 1944, to train as camp guards because of their severe shortage after the women's subcamp of Stutthof called Bromberg-Ost (Konzentrationslager Bromberg-Ost) was set up in the city of Bydgoszcz.

Several Norwegian Waffen SS volunteers worked as guards or as instructors for prisoners from Nordic countries, according to senior researcher at the Norwegian Center for Studies of Holocaust and Religious Minorities, Terje Emberland.

Prisoners

The first 150 inmates, imprisoned on 2 September 1939, were selected among Poles and Jews arrested in Danzig immediately after the outbreak of war. The inmate population rose to 6,000 in the following two weeks, on 15 September 1939. Until 1942, nearly all of the prisoners were Polish. The number of inmates increased considerably in 1944, with Jews forming a significant proportion of the newcomers. The first contingent of 2,500 Jewish prisoners arrived from Auschwitz in July 1944. In total, 23,566 Jews (including 21,817 women) were transferred to Stutthof from Auschwitz, and 25,053 (including 16,123 women) from camps in the Baltic states. When the Soviet army began its advance through German-occupied Estonia in July and August 1944, the camp staff of Klooga concentration camp evacuated the majority of the inmates by sea and sent them to Stutthof. Other sources say that the camp staff shot most remaining inmates in a mass murder.

Stutthof's registered inmates included citizens of 28 countries, and besides Jews and Poles – Germans, Czechs, Dutch, Belgians, French, Norwegians, Finns, Danes, Lithuanians, Latvians, Belarusians, Russians, Croats and others. Among 110,000 prisoners were Jews from all of Europe, members of the Polish underground, Polish civilians deported from Warsaw during the Warsaw Uprising, Lithuanian and Latvian intelligentsia, Latvian resistance fighters, psychiatric patients, Soviet prisoners of war, and communists (as an example of communist deportations to Stutthof, see the Danish Horserød camp). One prominent inmate and survivor of the Stutthof concentration camp was member of parliament for the Communist Party of Denmark Martin Nielsen, who detailed his deportation to, experience in and ensuing death march from the camp in his book  ('Report from Stutthof'). It is believed that inmates sent for immediate execution were not registered.

Conditions 

Conditions in the camp were extremely harsh; tens of thousands of prisoners succumbed to starvation and disease. Many died in typhus epidemics that swept the camp in the winter of 1942 and again in 1944; those whom the SS guards judged too weak or sick to work were gassed in the camp's small gas chamber. The first executions were carried out on 11 January and 22 March 1940 – 89 Polish activists and government officials were shot. Gassing with Zyklon B began in June 1944. 4,000 prisoners, including Jewish women and children, were killed in a gas chamber before the evacuation of the camp. Another method of execution practiced in Stutthof was lethal injection of phenol. Prisoners were also drowned in mud or clubbed to death. Between 63,000 and 65,000 people died in the camp.

A range of German organisations and individuals used Stutthof prisoners as forced laborers. Many prisoners worked in SS-owned businesses such as DAW (literally the 'German Equipment Works'), the heavily guarded armaments factory located inside the camp next to prisoner barracks. Other inmates labored in local brickyards, in private industrial enterprises, in agriculture, or in the camp's own workshops. In 1944, as forced labor by concentration camp prisoners became increasingly important in armaments production, a Focke-Wulf aircraft factory was constructed at Stutthof. Eventually, the Stutthof camp system became a network of forced-labor camps. The Holocaust Encyclopedia estimates that (less officially) some 105 Stutthof subcamps were established throughout northern and central Poland. The major subcamps were in Toruń (Thorn) and in Elbląg (Elbing).

Alleged human soap production  

There was a controversy regarding whether corpses from Stutthof were used in the production of soap made from human corpses at the lab of Professor Rudolf Spanner.

Historian Joachim Neander argued that, contrary to some claims made in the previous years, what the Institute of National Remembrance (IPN) calls the "chemical substance which was essentially soap" was the byproduct of Spanner's bone maceration processes done to create anatomical models at the Danzig Anatomical Institute, where he worked and which was not part of the Stutthof camp. The corpses used for this were not made from "harvested" bodies, and the byproduct of Spanner's work at the Danzig institute was collected. This was conflated with the separate debunked rumours of industrial production of human soap in concentration camps, which circulated during the war, and thereafter used as proof of this during the Nuremberg trials. 

Polish historians and employees at the IPN; Monika Tomkiewicz and Piotr Semków, reached similar conclusions. Semków states that the presence of human fat tissue has been confirmed in the samples of soapy grease (claimed to be "unfinished soap") from Danzig presented during the trials through analysis performed by the IPN and Gdańsk University of Technology in 2011 and 2006, respectively, but his and Tomkiewicz research concluded that this was a byproduct stemming from Spanner's work in bone maceration at the institute unrelated to the Stutthof camp. Spanner was unlikely to have "really occupied himself with the production of usable soap from human fat", and that any soap production in his laboratory was likely marginal. It was also added that Spanner was arrested twice after the war but released after each time after explaining how he had conducted the maceration and injection process of his models and was declared "clean" by the denazification program in 1948, officially exonerated, and resumed his academic career.

Sub-camps 
The main German concentration camp in Stutthof had as many as 40 sub-camps during World War II. In total, the sub-camps held 110,000 prisoners from 25 countries according to the Jewish Virtual Library. The sub-camps of Stutthof included:

 Bottschin in Bocień 
 Bromberg-Ost in Bydgoszcz
 DAG Factory in Bydgoszcz
 Bruss (Brusy)
 Chorabie (Chorab)
 Cieszyny
 Danzig–Burggraben in Kokoszki
 Danzig–Holm (Gdańsk–Ostrów Island)
 Danzig–Neufahrwasser (Gdańsk–Nowy Port)
 Danziger Werft in Gdańsk
 Dzimianen (Dziemiany)
 Außenstelle Elbing in Elbląg
 Elbing / Org. Todt (Elbląg)
 Elbing / Schichau-Werke (Elbląg)
 Pölitz (Police near Szczecin)
 Gotenhafen in Gdynia
 Gdynia-Orłowo
 Außenarbeitslager Gerdauen (Zheleznodorozhny)
 Graudenz in Grudziądz
 Grenzdorf in Graniczna Wieś
 Grodno
 Gutowo
 Gwisdyn in Gwiździny
 KL Heiligenbeil (Mamonovo)
 Hopehill in Nadbrzeże
 Jesau/Juschny, Russia
 Kolkau
 Königsberg in Kaliningrad
 Krzemieniewo
 Lauenburg (Lębork)
 Matzkau in Maćkowy (now within city limits of Gdańsk)
 Malken Mierzynek
 Mikoszewo
 Camp Nawitz in Nawitz/Nawcz
 Niskie
 Obrzycko
 Pelplin
 Potulitz in Potulice
 Praust/Pruszcz Gdański
 Przebrno
 Russoschin in Rusocin
 Brodnica
 Schichau-Werft in Gdańsk
 Schirkenpass (Scherokopas)
 Schippenbeil/Sępopol, Poland
 Seerappen/Lyublino, Russia 
 Sophienwalde
 Stolp/Słupsk
 Preußisch Stargard (Starogard Gdański)
 Susz
 Thorn (AEG, Org. Todt) in Toruń
 Westerplatte in Gdańsk
 Wiślinka
 Zeyersniederkampen in Kępiny Wielkie

Commandants 

The camp had two commanders:
 SS-Sturmbannführer Max Pauly, September 1939 – August 1942
 SS-Sturmbannführer Paul-Werner Hoppe, August 1942 – January 1945

Death march 

The evacuation of prisoners from the Stutthof camp system began on 25 January 1945. When the final evacuation began, there were nearly 50,000 prisoners, the majority of them Jews, in the Stutthof camp system. The prisoners were marched in the direction of Lauenburg in eastern Germany. Cut off by advancing Soviet forces the Germans forced the surviving prisoners back to Stutthof.

In late April 1945, the remaining prisoners were removed from Stutthof by sea, since the camp was completely encircled by Soviet forces. Again, hundreds of prisoners were forced into the sea and shot. Over 4,000 were sent by small boat to Germany, some to the Neuengamme concentration camp near Hamburg, and some to camps along the Baltic coast.

On 5 May 1945, a barge full of starving prisoners was towed into harbour at Klintholm Havn in Denmark where 351 of the 370 on board were saved. Shortly before the German surrender, some prisoners were transferred to Malmö, Sweden, and released into the care of that neutral country. It has been estimated that around half of the evacuated prisoners, over 25,000, died during the evacuation from Stutthof and its subcamps.

Soviet forces liberated Stutthof on 9 May 1945, rescuing about 100 prisoners who had managed to hide.

Stutthof trials 

The well known Nuremberg Trials were only concerned with concentration camps as evidence for war crimes and crimes against humanity committed by the Third Reich leadership. Several lesser known trials followed against the staff of various concentration camps. Poland held four trials in Gdańsk against former guards and kapos of Stutthof, charging them with crimes of war and crimes against humanity.

The first trial was held from 25 April to 31 May 1946, against 30 ex-officials and prisoner-guards of the camp. The Soviet/Polish Special Criminal Court found all of them guilty of the charges. Eleven defendants including the former commander, Johann Pauls, were sentenced to death. The rest were sentenced to various terms of imprisonment.

The second trial was held from 8 October to 31 October 1947, before a Polish Special Criminal Court. Arraigned 24 ex-officials and guards of the Stutthof concentration camp were judged and found guilty. Ten were sentenced to death.

The third trial was held from 5 November to 10 November 1947, before a Polish Special Criminal Court. Arraigned 20 ex-officials and guards were judged; 19 were found guilty, and one was acquitted.

The fourth and final trial was also held before a Polish Special Criminal Court, from 19 November to 29 November 1947. Twenty-seven ex-officials and guards were arraigned and judged; 26 were found guilty, and one was acquitted.

An additional trial was attempted in November 2018, when Johann Rehbogen was accused of being an accessory to murder. There was no evidence to link him to specific killings, and though he admitted to serving at the camp, he said that he was unaware that people were being murdered there. He was charged as a juvenile, as he was under 21 at the time of the offense. Images in the news broadcasts concealed his face for legal reasons. Being tried at the age of 94, court proceedings were limited to no more than two hours per day and two non-consecutive days per week. In February 2019 the trial of a defendant matching this description (whom Reuters reported could not be named for legal reasons) was halted after a medical report was issued stating that the defendant was unfit to stand trial, the trial already having been suspended since the previous December.

Another Nazi camp guard, Bruno Dey, from Hamburg was charged in October 2019 of contributing to the killings of 5,230 prisoners at Stutthof camp between 1944 and 1945. He was tried in a juvenile court due to being about 17 at that time. On 23 July 2020, he was given a two-year suspended sentence by the court in Hamburg.

In July 2021, a 96-year-old German secretary, Irmgard Furchner, who had been part of KZ Stutthof was arrested to be tried for war crimes.  On 28 September 2021, Frau Furchner left her home in Hamburg and failed to show for her hearing, she was captured on 30 September 2021 and the hearing was rescheduled for 19 October 2021. On 20 December 2022 Furchner, then 97, was convicted of being an accessory to murder of more than 10,000 people at Stutthof concentration camp during World War II. A two-year suspended sentence in line with that requested by prosecutors was handed down by the Itzehoe state court in northern Germany.

Filming location

In 1999, Artur Żmijewski filmed a group of nude people playing tag in one of the Stutthof gas chambers, sparking outrage.

Notable inmates
Reidar Kvammen, Norwegian international football player
Ingrid Pitt, Polish-British actress, author, and writer
Julia Rodzińska, Dominican Sister, blessed of the Catholic Church
Balys Sruoga, Lithuanian poet playwright, critic, and literary theorist
Martin Nielsen (politician), Danish politician and member of parliament

See also 

 Female guards in Nazi concentration camps
 List of Nazi-German concentration camps
 Nazi crimes against ethnic Poles
 Rescue of Stutthof victims in Denmark

References

Citations

Sources 

 Stutthof National Museum. Selection of monographs in PDF from Zeszyty Muzeum Stutthof No. 1–8. Zakład Narodowy im. Ossolińskich. 
 Memorial to the Victims of the Stutthof Concentration Camp
 Several authors, Monografia KL Stutthof (KL Stutthof monograph) Organization, prisoners, subcamps, extermination, responsibility. 
 SS personnel serving at Ravensbrück, Axis History.com
 SS personnel serving at Stutthof, Axis History.com
 
 Brief facts and photos of the camp
 Joachim Neander *"The Danzig Soap Case: Facts and Legends around "Professor Spanner" and the Danzig Anatomic Institute 1944-1945", German Studies Review

External links 

 Marek Orski: Zbrodnie hitlerowskie w obozie koncentracyjnym Stutthof : liczba ofiar w świetle źródeł i badań : próba bilansu. "Acta Cassubiana" 2000. Vol. 2.

 
1939 establishments in Poland
1945 disestablishments in Poland
Stutthof
Museums in Pomeranian Voivodeship
Registered museums in Poland
World War II museums in Poland
World War II sites in Poland